This table displays the top-rated primetime television series of the 1990–91 season as measured by Nielsen Media Research.

References

1990 in American television
1991 in American television
1990-related lists
1991-related lists
Lists of American television series